Alexandra Bocancea (born 22 October 1989) is a Moldovan footballer who plays as a forward and a midfielder. She has played officially for the senior Moldova women's national team.

International career
Bocancea capped for Moldova at senior level during the UEFA Women's Euro 2017 qualifying preliminary round, in a 3–0 win against Luxembourg on 9 April 2015, and during the UEFA Women's Euro 2017 qualifying Group 4, in a 1–3 home loss to Poland on 27 November 2015.

See also
List of Moldova women's international footballers

References

1989 births
Living people
Women's association football forwards
Women's association football midfielders
Moldovan women's footballers
Footballers from Transnistria
People from Tiraspol
Moldova women's international footballers